Al-Mazyona is a Wilayat of Dhofar in the Sultanate of Oman. near the border with Yemen.

References 

Populated places in Oman
Oman–Yemen border crossings